The 2010–11 Borussia Dortmund season began on 14 August 2010 with a DFB-Pokal match against Wacker Burghausen, and ended on 14 May 2011, the last matchday of the Bundesliga, with a match against Eintracht Frankfurt.

Dortmund were eliminated in the second round of the DFB-Pokal and in the group stage of the UEFA Europa League. Dortmund were crowned league champions on 30 April 2011, two weeks before the final matches were played.

Season
In March 2011, three suspected explosive devices were discovered and diffused or made safe near Borussia Dortmund's stadium, Signal Iduna Park. German police arrested a 25-year-old man in Cologne after he was found to have sent anonymous tips to the police about planned attacks.

The final match against Eintracht Frankfurt was oversubscribed. Up until March 31, the club have received 301,752 requests for tickets, in addition to their 50,000 season-ticket holders. Borussia Dortmund set a deadline of 10 April for applications for the game. A ballot determined who got the final 21,000 tickets.

Transfers

Summer transfers

In:

Out:

Winter transfers

In:

Out:

Statistics

Goals and appearances

|}
Last updated: 14 May 2011

Competitions

Bundesliga

League table

Matches

DFB-Pokal

UEFA Europa League

Play-off round

Group stage

See also
2010–11 Bundesliga
2010–11 UEFA Europa League
2010–11 DFB-Pokal
Borussia Dortmund

References

Borussia Dortmund seasons
Borussia Dortmund
German football championship-winning seasons
Borussia Dortmund